Aimee Song (born ) is an American fashion blogger and fashion designer. She started blogging in 2008 while studying Interior Architecture in San Francisco, and created a blog called Song of Style. She created a jewelry line, Song of Style, and an apparel collection, Two Songs. She is a fashion ambassador for Chloé, Giorgio Armani Beauty, Dior and Revolve and she has worked with Laura Mercier. She has collaborated with brands including True Religion, Biossance and Levi’s. The Business of Fashion named her one of their BoF 500 people shaping the fashion industry in 2018. She was on Forbes’ 30 Under 30 list in 2016 and her book Capture Your Style was on The New York Times best-seller list. Her second book Aimee Song: World of Style was published in 2018.

References 

American bloggers
American fashion designers
Year of birth missing (living people)
Living people